Leroy Patrick Chollet (March 5, 1924 – June 10, 1998) was an American basketball player. He was a 6'2" (1.88 m), 190 lb (86 kg) forward.

He played collegiately for Canisius College, and Loyola College in New Orleans. He is a member of both schools Athletics Hall of Fame.

He played for the Syracuse Nationals in the NBA for 63 games from 1949 to 1951.

He was the head varsity basketball coach from 1956-1960 at St. Edward High School (Ohio).

References

External links

1924 births
1998 deaths
American men's basketball players
Basketball players from New Orleans
Canisius Golden Griffins men's basketball players
Loyola Wolf Pack men's basketball players
Small forwards
Syracuse Nationals players
Utica Pros players